Anthony Benezet, born Antoine Bénézet (January 31, 1713May 3, 1784), was a French-American abolitionist and educator who was active in Philadelphia, Pennsylvania. One of the early American abolitionists, Benezet founded one of the world's first anti-slavery societies, the Society for the Relief of Free Negroes Unlawfully Held in Bondage (after his death it was revived as the Pennsylvania Society for Promoting the Abolition of Slavery); the first public school for girls in North America; and the Negro School at Philadelphia, which operated into the nineteenth century. He was a vegetarian and advocated for the kind treatment of animals, integrating this in his teachings.

Biography
Antoine was born in Saint-Quentin, France, to Jean-Étienne de Bénézet (later known as John Stephen Benezet) and his wife Judith de la Méjanelle, who were Huguenots (French Protestants).  The Huguenots had been persecuted and suffered violent attacks in France since the 1685 revocation of the Edict of Nantes, which had provided religious tolerance. For a while his family had received protection owing to their powerful connections. However in 1715 his father's goods were seized, so, like many others, the family left France rather than give up their religion. They moved first to Rotterdam, then briefly to Greenwich before settling in London, where there was a sizeable Huguenot refugee community. In 1727 Benezet joined the Religious Society of Friends (also known as Quakers).

In 1731 the Benezet family migrated to Philadelphia, Pennsylvania, founded by Quakers and one of the English colonies of North America. Then 18 years old, Anthony Benezet joined John Woolman as one of the earliest American abolitionists. Like Woolman, Benezet also advocated war tax resistance.  Several years later in 1736, he married Joyce Marriott.

In Philadelphia, Benezet worked to persuade his Quaker brethren that slave-owning was not consistent with Christian doctrine. He believed that the ban on slavery in the British Isles should be extended to the North American and Caribbean colonies. (After the Americans gained independence in the Revolutionary War, Benezet continued to urge the United States to ban slavery, and the state of Pennsylvania legislated slavery's gradual abolition in 1780.)

After several years as a failed merchant, in 1739 Benezet began teaching at a Germantown school, then a separate jurisdiction northwest of Philadelphia. In 1742, he moved to the Friends' English School of Philadelphia (now the William Penn Charter School). In 1750 he added night classes for black slaves to his schedule.

In 1755, Benezet left the Friends' English School to set up his own school, the first public girls' school on the American continent. His students included daughters from prominent families, such as Deborah Norris and Sally Wister.

In 1770, he founded the Negro School at Philadelphia for black children. There was a growing free black community in Philadelphia, which increased after the state abolished slavery. Abolitionist sympathizers, such as Abigail Hopper Gibbons, continued to teach at Benezet's Negro School in the years before the American Civil War.

In 1775, he helped found the first anti-slavery society, the Society for the Relief of Free Negroes Unlawfully Held in Bondage. Eight years later in 1783, Benezet wrote a letter to Charlotte of Mecklenburg-Strelitz discussing "the cruelty of slavery and his opposition to the slave trade." After Benezet's death, Benjamin Franklin and Dr. Benjamin Rush reconstituted this association as the Pennsylvania Society for Promoting the Abolition of Slavery.

Legacy 
In 1817, the abolitionist Roberts Vaux published a biography about Anthony Benezet.

Works
 Observations on the inslaving [sp], importing and purchasing of Negroes. With some advice thereon, extracted from the Epistle of the yearly-meeting of the people called Quakers held at London in the year 1748., 1760

This brief work, written while Benezet was teaching at the Quaker Girls' School in Philadelphia, was the author's first publication to draw on sources documenting the African trade in slavery.

 An Epistle of Caution and Advice, Concerning the Buying and Keeping of Slaves, 1754
 A short account of that part of Africa inhabited by the negroes, 1762
 A Caution and Warning to Great Britain and her Colonies, in a short representation of the calamitous state of the enslaved negroes in the British Dominions. Collected from various authors, etc., 1767
 Some Historical Account of Guinea ... With an inquiry into the rise and progress of the slave-trade ... Also a republication of the sentiments of several authors of note on this interesting subject; particularly an extract of a treatise by Granville Sharp, 1771
 The potent enemies of America laid open : being some account of the baneful effects attending the use of distilled spirituous liquors, and the slavery of the Negroes : to which is added, The happiness attending life, when dedicated to the honour of God, and good of mankind, in the sentiments of some persons of eminence near the close of their lives, viz. the Earl of Essex, Count Oxcistern, H. Grotius, D. Brainard, John Lock, &c., 1774.
 The mighty destroyer displayed, in some account of the dreadful havock made by the mistaken use as well as abuse of distilled spirituous liquors, 1774. 
 Some observations on the situation, disposition, and character of the Indian natives of this continent, 1784.

See also
Benjamin Rush
David Cooper (abolitionist) contemporary abolitionist, authored book, coauthored by Benezet
List of abolitionist forerunners

Notes

References

"Anthony Benezet: biography and bibliography", Slavery, Emancipation, and Abolition
 
 

Webster's Biographical Dictionary, G. & C. Merriam Co., Springfield, MA (1980).

Further reading

External links
 
 
 Online Books by Anthony Benezet

1713 births
1784 deaths
18th-century Quakers
American abolitionists
American anti-war activists
American civil rights activists
American Quakers
American tax resisters
American vegetarianism activists
Burials in Pennsylvania
Converts to Quakerism
Educators from Pennsylvania
French emigrants to the Thirteen Colonies
French Protestants
People from Saint-Quentin, Aisne
People of colonial Pennsylvania
Quaker abolitionists